The White Birch is a Norwegian slowcore project of Ola Fløttum. Previously a trio composed of Ola Fløttum, Hans Christian Almendingen, and Ulf Rogde, the band released three studio albums and then broke up after the band played their last show in 2006. However, Ola Fløttum released their fourth album "The Weight Of Spring" in 2015, nearly ten years after their last release.

The name comes from the 1994 album The White Birch by the band Codeine, one of the cornerstones of slowcore. They are sometimes called the "Norwegian Sigur Rós."

Discography
 "Self-Portrayal" (1996, limited edition of 300 copies on vinyl)
 "Left Hand EP" (1997, a limited edition EP of 200 copies)
 "People Now Human Beings" (1998)
 "Star Is Just A Sun" (2002) [ allmusic review]
 "Come Up For Air" (2005) [ allmusic review]
 "The Weight Of Spring" (2015)

References

External links

 archives of official website www.thewhitebirch.no on archive.org
 Myspace page

Norwegian musical trios
Norwegian alternative rock groups
Rune Grammofon artists
Sadcore and slowcore groups
Glitterhouse Records artists